Karim Shabazz (born November 2, 1978) is an American former professional basketball player. He played at the center position.

Shabazz played college basketball at both Florida State University and Providence College. He went undrafted in 2001 NBA draft.

While playing for Charleston Lowgators he was named NBDL Defensive Player of the Year for the 2003–04 season.

References

External links
Eurobasket.com Profile
Legabasket.it Profile
NBA draft 2001 Profile
RealGM.com Profile

1978 births
Living people
American expatriate basketball people in Germany
American expatriate basketball people in Italy
American expatriate basketball people in Luxembourg
American expatriate basketball people in Poland
American expatriate basketball people in Sweden
American expatriate basketball people in Uruguay
Charleston Lowgators players
Florida State Seminoles men's basketball players
Pallacanestro Varese players
Providence Friars men's basketball players
Sportspeople from Queens, New York
Basketball players from New York City
Lawrence Woodmere Academy alumni
American men's basketball players
Centers (basketball)